is a Japanese former football player.

Club statistics

References

External links

library.footballjapan.jp

1985 births
Living people
Association football people from Yamanashi Prefecture
Japanese footballers
J1 League players
J2 League players
Japan Football League players
Ventforet Kofu players
Blaublitz Akita players
Association football midfielders